Vesperus strepens is a species of brown coloured beetle in the family Vesperidae, found in France and Italy.

References

Vesperidae
Beetles described in 1792
Beetles of Europe
Taxa named by Johan Christian Fabricius